The National Commodore (NACO) of the United States Coast Guard Auxiliary is its most senior and principal officer. The national commodore represents the Auxiliary and reports to the commandant of the Coast Guard through the vice commandant of the Coast Guard. Additionally, the national commodore represents the Auxiliary with all Coast Guard flag officers and flag officer equivalent civilians at Coast Guard headquarters on Auxiliary matters.   The national commodore functions to support the commandant's strategic goals and objectives and serve auxiliarists.

Evolution of title
The title of national commodore dates to 1951, when Bert C. Pouncey, Jr. was elected as the first NACO at the first National Conference.

List of National Commodores
There have been 36 national commodores of the Coast Guard Auxiliary since the office was enacted in 1951. Gus Formato is the current national commodore.

See also

Commandant of the Coast Guard
Master Chief Petty Officer of the Coast Guard

References

External links
National Commodore's official website

United States Coast Guard job titles